Maximilian Kofler (born 18 August 2000) is an Austrian motorcycle rider, contracted to compete in the 2022 Supersport World Championship with CM Racing Ducati.

Career

Junior career
Kofler started racing bikes at age seven, and competed in MiniMoto and SuperMoto bikes from 2007 until 2016, winning both Austrian and German championships.

In 2017 he competed in the Italian Moto3 Championship and finished the season 8th in the standings. He graduated to the Moto3 Junior World Championships, where he competed full-time in 2018 and 2019 with limited success, finishing 25th and 17th respectively.

Moto3 World Championship

2017
Kofler made his debut Grand Prix wild-card appearance during his home round at the Red Bull Ring in 2017, finishing the race in 23rd.

2018
He once again made a one-off appearance in the 2018 season's Austrian GP round, this time finishing in 29th.

2019
Kofler would race in two Grand Prixs in the 2019 season, finishing 20th in Austria, and 28th in Great Britain.

2020
He became a full-time Moto3 Grand Prix rider in 2020, signed by the CIP Green Power team to partner Darryn Binder. Although Kofler did not score a single point during the year, he was retained by the CIP Green Power team for the 2021 season.

2021
The 2021 Moto3 World Championship saw improvements from Kofler, finishing 15th and 14th in the first two races of the year in Doha, Qatar, before a serious accident in Mugello fractured four vertebrae in his chest, causing him to miss an extended time of the season. He returned with a 9th place in Austria, but that was his last point scoring finish of the season, ending the year with only 10 points, 26th in the standings. Kofler was not given a new contract for 2022 by Moto3 teams.

Supersport World Championship

2022
In 2022, Kofler joined the 2022 Supersport World Championship with CM Racing, riding on the Ducati Panigale V2.

Career statistics

Grand Prix motorcycle racing

By season

By class

Races by year
(key) (Races in bold indicate pole position; races in italics indicate fastest lap)

Supersport World Championship

Races by year
(key) (Races in bold indicate pole position, races in italics indicate fastest lap)

 Season still in progress.

References

External links

 Official Site

2000 births
Living people
Austrian motorcycle racers
Moto3 World Championship riders
Sportspeople from Upper Austria
Supersport World Championship riders